The Kuang Komuter station is a Malaysian commuter train station located in Kuang, Gombak District, Selangor, Malaysia. Since December 2015, this station is served by the Port Klang Line of the KTM Komuter service. Previously, it was on the Rawang-Seremban Line.

Branch line
This station served as the start of a 23 km-long branch line to Batu Arang and Batang Berjuntai during colonial era, but the line was closed in 1971.

References

External links
 Kuang KTM Railway Station

Gombak District
Railway stations in Selangor
Rawang-Seremban Line